Dr. Hariri's house (Persian: خانه دكتر حريري) is a historical house built on Tarbiat street in Tabriz, Iran in the 19th century during the Qajar period. It has been added to the list of national heritage due to its beautiful architectural features. The Iranian Azerbaijan Press Museum has been operating in the building since 2017.

About 
Hariri's house was built in the 19th century in Tabriz. The building dates back to the Qajar period, and consists of two blocks facing the qibla, with both an inner and an outer courtyard. Numerous paintings, various designs and colors on the walls makes Dr. Hariri's house different from other old houses in Tabriz. The rooms of Hariri's house are decorated with unique wall paintings that amaze everyone. The building was registered as a national monument on January 17, 1999.

Press Museum 
The "Azerbaijan Press Museum" has been operating on the first floor of the building since 2017. Although the decision to establish the museum was made five years ago, the museum opened in August 2017. At the opening ceremony, the head of the East Azerbaijan Islamic Guidance and Culture Department, Mohammad Mohammadpur, called Azerbaijan a leading region of the country's media. He later said:

Photos

See also
 Tabriz
 Nobar bath
 Shahnaz street

References

Buildings and structures in Tabriz
Museums in Tabriz
Buildings of the Qajar period